Shimokita may refer to:

 Shimokita District, Aomori
 Shimokita Peninsula
 JDS Shimokita, a Japanese ship
 JS Shimokita, a ship operated by the Japan Maritime Self-Defense Force
 Shimokita (train), a train service in Japan